My Little One may refer to:
 My Little One (1933 film), an Italian drama film
 My Little One (2018 film), the working title for the Russian drama Ayka (Айка)